World's Strongest Team is an annual strongman contest that consists of either 2 or 3 man teams from various countries all over the world. The contest was first held in 1995. In recent years it has been organised by Strongmen Eddie Hall and Glenn Ross in Stoke-on-Trent

The 2016 show is taking place on June 5, 2016 at Northwood Stadium

More details and info can be found on www.ultimatewst.co.uk

Results

Results courtesy of David Horne's World of Grip

References

External links
David Horne's World of Grip
 
World's Strongest Team

Strongmen competitions